Nick Niemann (born December 2, 1997) is an American football linebacker for the Los Angeles Chargers of the National Football League (NFL). He was selected with the 185th Pick of the 2021 NFL Draft. He played college football at Iowa.

College career

Niemann was ranked as a threestar recruit by 247Sports.com coming out of high school. He committed to Iowa on June 19, 2015.

Professional career
Niemann was drafted by the Los Angeles Chargers with the 185th pick in the sixth round of the 2021 NFL Draft on May 1, 2021. On May 16, 2021, Niemann signed his four-year rookie contract with Los Angeles.

Personal life

Niemann is the brother of former Iowa linebacker (and former Kansas City Chiefs linebacker) Ben Niemann.

References

1997 births
Living people
American football linebackers
Iowa Hawkeyes football players
Los Angeles Chargers players
People from Sycamore, Illinois
Players of American football from Illinois
Sportspeople from the Chicago metropolitan area